The Basingas were an Anglo-Saxon tribe, whose territory in the Loddon Valley formed a regio or administrative subdivision of the early Kingdom of Wessex. Their leader, Basa, gave the tribe its name which survives in the names of Old Basing and Basingstoke, both in Hampshire.  (The existence of both the tribe and their leader must be assumed to have been inferred from the existence of the place name "Basingstoke" as there is no independent documentary evidence referring to them.)

Old Basing was first settled around 700 by an Anglo-Saxon tribe known as the Basingas, who give the village its name (the meaning is "Basa's people"). It was the site of the Battle of Basing on 22 January 871, when a Danish army defeated Ethelred of Wessex. It is also mentioned in the Domesday Book of 1086.

The subdivision of the Basingas retained a role beyond the Anglo-Saxon period as Basingstoke remained the administrative centre for a distinctive grouping of hundreds within Hampshire throughout the Middle Ages.

References

Peoples of Anglo-Saxon England
History of Hampshire